"Lonely Day" is a song by Armenian American heavy metal band System of a Down. It was released in 2006 as the second single from their fifth album Hypnotize (2005), and written by guitarist Daron Malakian, who also provides lead vocals on this track. The song received a nomination for Best Hard Rock Performance at the 49th Annual Grammy Awards. This was System of a Down's last single for 14 years, until they released two new songs ("Protect the Land" and "Genocidal Humanoidz") in 2020.

The song is featured in the 2007 film Disturbia, as well as the film's trailer; however, it is not included in the film's soundtrack.

Music video
The music video opens with a shot of downtown Los Angeles, with the traffic light at the corner of S Broadway & 6th St on fire. The video continues with shots of the band members. There are other various shots of other items that are on fire. In order of appearance, they are as follows: a padlock, a building, shrubs in front of an office building, a newspaper dispenser, a shopping cart, a pay phone, a train car, a stack of wooden pallets, several trees, a billboard, a single car in traffic among other non-burning cars, an advertisement in Chinese at a bus stop, a bench at a train station, a dumpster, a building, and the roof of a gas station.

As of January 2023, the song has 320 million views on YouTube.

Track listing

Personnel

 Daron Malakian – guitars, lead vocals
 Serj Tankian – keyboards, vocals
 Shavo Odadjian – bass guitar
 John Dolmayan – drums

Chart positions

Certifications

References

External links

System of a Down songs
2005 singles
2000s ballads
Song recordings produced by Rick Rubin
Songs written by Daron Malakian
2005 songs
American alternative rock songs